Adaina planaltina is a moth of the family Pterophoridae. It is found in the Federal District of Brazil.

The wingspan is about 14 mm. The head is scaled and yellow-white. The forewings are yellow-white with dark brown markings and brownish white fringes. The underside is grey-brown. The hindwings are pale brown-grey with brownish white fringes. The underside is grey-brown.

Adults have been recorded in August (mid-winter).

Etymology
The species is named after the collecting area, Planaltina in Brazil.

References

Moths described in 1992
Oidaematophorini